Mile Starčević may refer to:

 Mile Starčević (politician, born 1862), Croatian politician
 Mile Starčević (politician, born 1904), Croatian politician